Mekenna Melvin (born January 23, 1985) is an American actress best known for playing Alex McHugh in Chuck, Angela in Three Rivers and Stefanie Fife in Lie to Me. She also co-created and starred as Amber Hannold in Amber Lake, an independent film released in 2010.

Personal life 
Melvin was born and raised in Saratoga, California. She became interested in acting at a young age through spending time at a local theater with her mother, a theater director, and made her first acting appearance as Woodstock in a local performance of You're a Good Man, Charlie Brown at the age of 5. She is a graduate of Independence High School in San Jose, California.

She trained at both the American Academy of Dramatic Arts in New York City, New York and the British American Drama Academy in Oxford, England.

Melvin is professionally trained as an actress, dancer, and singer, and also has martial arts training, at the level of a first degree blackbelt, in taekwondo.

She openly dated Erik Stocklin until they separated.

Filmography

References

External links 
 
 

1985 births
21st-century American actresses
Actresses from San Jose, California
Alumni of the British American Drama Academy
American Academy of Dramatic Arts alumni
American female taekwondo practitioners
American film actresses
American television actresses
Living people
People from Saratoga, California